Elemental Machines is a company based in Cambridge, Massachusetts that uses sensors and artificial intelligence to help biotechnology and pharmaceutical companies detect and identify research problems. Elemental Machines was founded by Sonny Vu and Sridhar Iyengar, two former MIT roommates who previously founded and sold AgaMatrix, a company focused on technologies to treat diabetes, and Misfit Wearables, a company that produced fitness trackers and was sold to watchmaker Fossil Group for $260 million in 2016.

Elemental Machines uses a system of sensors and software to monitor lab conditions and detect anomalies relating to temperature, vibration, humidity, and other factors that might interfere with experiments or skew results.

The company received $2.5 million in funding from Founders Fund and claims it has contracts with 30 customers. In the summer of 2018, Elemental Machines announced an additional $9M in funding from Digitalis Ventures and other investors. It is believed they have more than 150 customers as of November 2019.

Products

Element-T 
The Element-T for temperature is an Internet of Things sensor that is used to measure temperature of equipment such as freezers, fridges, incubators and cold storage areas. These temperature readings are transmitted via Bluetooth to a tablet device, or Gateway, which is connected to the Internet. Temperature readings are uploaded every 15 seconds to the Elemental Cloud where they can be accessed by certified users. Alerts can be set to notify users of any out of specification readings. For instance if a -80C freezer's temperature increases above a threshold level (like -60C) the system will send a text alert to the user letting them know their freezer temperature is out of spec. The user can then take action to preserve the contents of their freezer.

Element-A 
The Element-A is an Internet of Things (IoT) sensor that measures temperature, pressure, humidity and light simultaneously and transmits these readings via Bluetooth to the Gateway. The Element-A is typically used to monitor environments and micro-environments. Typical uses would include monitoring parts of a laboratory, animal research facilities or incubators. An article in The Scientist demonstrated how an HVAC system blowing on an HPLC instrument was causing erratic readings and the customer was able to discover this error using an Element-A to monitor the environment.

Element-D 
The Element-D (for data) is an Internet of Things device used to extract data and metadata from other pieces of equipment, such as lab balances, incubators, blood glucose analyzers and other commonly used instruments. Once the data is extracted from the instrument it is uploaded to the Elemental Cloud via WiFi where it can be accessed by certified users. In this way, data can be collected from a variety of OEM instruments without any special software or interface. These data can then be shared via API with the users LIMS or ELN system or can be stored in another database.

References 

Electronics companies of the United States